Sydney John Hobson (born 3 July 1917) is an Australian former professional rugby league footballer who played for Eastern Suburbs in the New South Wales Rugby League (NSWRL) competition.

Playing career
Described as a 'tough as teak' , Hobson played for the Eastern Suburbs club in the years 1944–49 in Australia's major rugby league competition – the New South Wales Rugby League (NSWRL). Hobson was a member of Easts' 1945 premiership winning side.

Hobson also played for the rural New South Wales town of Young, the 'Cherry Pickers'.

In 1946 Hobson represented his state after being named as a reserve for New South Wales on 3 previous occasions.

Sources
 Whiticker, Alan & Hudson, Glen (2006) The Encyclopedia of Rugby League Players, Gavin Allen Publishing, Sydney

References

1917 births
Possibly living people
Australian rugby league players
Sydney Roosters players
Country New South Wales rugby league team players
Rugby league second-rows
Rugby league players from Newcastle, New South Wales